"You Don't Miss Your Water ('Til the Well Runs Dry)" is a song by British singer Craig David's. It was written by David and Mark Hill for his second studio album Slicker Than Your Average (2002), while production was helmed by Hill, with duo Soulshock and Peter Biker credited as additional producers. The song was released as the album's sixth and final single from and became one of David's lowest-charting singles to date, reaching number 43 on the UK Singles Chart.

Music video
The video for "You Don't Miss Your Water ('Til the Well Runs Dry)" was a live performance video.

Chart performance
"You Don't Miss Your Water ('Til the Well Runs Dry)" charted and peaked at forty-three on the UK Singles Chart, spending two weeks in the top 75.

Covers
The song was covered by Rising Appalachia on their 2010 album, The Sails of Self.

Track listing

Notes
  signifies an additional producer

Charts

Release history

References

2002 songs
2003 singles
Contemporary R&B ballads
Craig David songs
Songs written by Craig David
Songs written by Mark Hill (musician)